Auditore is a frazione of the comune of Sassocorvaro Auditore in the Province of Pesaro e Urbino in the Italian region Marche, located about  northwest of Ancona and about  southwest of Pesaro. It was a separate comune until 31 December 2018.

References

Cities and towns in the Marche
Frazioni of the Province of Pesaro and Urbino